StarRay is a video game developed by Hidden Treasures and published by Logotron in 1988. Released for the Amiga, Atari ST, and Commodore 64, the game is an update on the concept of 1981 arcade game Defender, with faster gameplay and more detailed graphics and sound. The game was published in 1989 by Epyx as Revenge of Defender for the American market.

In 1991, the Amiga and Atari ST versions were re-issued in the UK on Prism Leisure's "16-Bit Pocket Power" imprint.

References

External links
 StarRay at Lemon Amiga
 StarRay at Atari Mania
 StarRay at Lemon 64

1988 video games
Amiga games
Atari ST games
Commodore 64 games
Epyx games
Scrolling shooters
Single-player video games
Video game clones
Video games developed in Germany
Logotron games